The Ambatolampy Solar Power Station is a 40 MW solar power plant in Madagascar. As of April 2022, it was the first grid-connected, privately-funded solar power plant in the country. The power plant, which was first commissioned in 2018, underwent expansion from 20 MW to 40 MW, between 2021 and 2022. The off-taker of the energy generated at this renewable energy power plant is Jirama, the national electricity utility company.

Location
The power station is located in the town of Ambatolampy, in the Vakinankaratra Region of Madagascar.

Overview
Madagascar had  installed generation capacity of 969 megawatts as of 2021. Only 2 percent was sourced from solar energy, with the rest sourced from fossil fuel sources. Ambatolampy Solar Power Station is the first and at that time was the largest grid-connected solar  power plant in the country. It represents the initial efforts to diversify the country's generation mix.

Ownership
The power station is owned by a consortium comprising (a) GreenYellow, a French IPP and a member of the Casino Group and (b) the Axian Group, a Madagascan investment conglomerate. The owners/developers have established a special purpose vehicle (SPV) company to own, develop, fund, build, operate and maintain the power station. For descriptive purposes, we will call the SPV company Ambatolampy Solar Consortium. The table below, illustrates the shareholding in Ambatolampy Solar Consortium.

Expansion
The original power station with generation capacity of 20 megawatts, was commercially commissioned in 2021. That phase of development received funding from (a) Société Générale (b) GuarantCo (a subsidiary of the Private Infrastructure Development Group (PIDG) (c) Banque Malgache de L’ocean Indien (BMOI) and (d) Banque Nationale d'Investissement (BNI) (National Investment Bank) of Madagascar.

Beginning in June 2021, the developers/owners of the power station began the expansion of the solar farm from 20 MW to 40 MW in generation capacity. This phase included the addition of a 5MW/5MWh battery storage system to stabilize the national electricity grid. This phase cost €17 million (US$$20.33 million) and received funding from (a) Société Générale (b) GuarantCo and (c) the African Guarantee Fund.

See also

List of power stations in Madagascar

References

External links
 Madagascar: Extension works for the Ambatolampy solar power plant are launched As of 21 June 2021.

Solar power stations in Madagascar
2018 establishments in Madagascar
Energy infrastructure completed in 2018
21st-century architecture in Madagascar